The First Methodist Episcopal Church  in Trinidad, Colorado, which has also been known as the First United Methodist Church, is a historic church at 216 Broom Street.  It was built in 1911 and was added to the National Register in 2005.

It was deemed "a good local example of an ecclesiastical interpretation of the Romanesque Revival style. Its metal-clad, central dome roof is a distinctive feature within Trinidad's architectural heritage, as is its yellow brick construction. Dome roofs are not often seen in Romanesque Revival churches in Colorado and red brick was the material of choice for the majority of Trinidad's buildings. The church also reflects important elements of the Akron Plan, a Protestant church design utilized during the late 19th and early 20th centuries."

References 

Methodist churches in Colorado
Churches on the National Register of Historic Places in Colorado
Romanesque Revival church buildings in Colorado
Churches completed in 1911
Churches in Las Animas County, Colorado
National Register of Historic Places in Las Animas County, Colorado
1911 establishments in Colorado